Forks Mountain is a summit located in Adirondack Mountains of New York located in the Town of Wells northeast of the hamlet of Wells. It is named Forks Mountain due to it being inside the Fork where the East Branch Sacandaga River meets the Sacandaga River.

References

Mountains of Hamilton County, New York
Mountains of New York (state)